According to the Territorial Administrative Division the cantons of Costa Rica are subdivided into 488 districts (distritos), each of which has a unique five digit postal code.

Government organization 
Each canton is divided into districts whose number varies from canton to canton. Each district has a District Council chaired by a syndic, all popularly elected. The District Council is the interlocutor between the district and the municipal government and ensures the communal and neighborhood interests before the Municipal Council; although the direct administration of the district falls to the municipality, the District Councils also exercise administrative functions such as forwarding projects to the Council and supervising the work of the mayor.

District Municipal Council 
There are eight District Municipal Councils, in districts that area geographically distant from the head city of the canton where the municipality is located, these councils are in charge of municipal administrative activities.

 Peñas Blancas, in San Ramón canton.
 Tucurrique, in Jiménez canton.
 Cervantes, in Alvarado canton.
 Colorado, in Abangares canton.
 Lepanto, in Puntarenas canton.
 Paquera, in Puntarenas canton.
 Monte Verde, in Puntarenas canton.
 Cóbano, in Puntarenas canton.

Postal codes 

Postal codes in Costa Rica are five digit numeric, and were introduced in March 2007, they are associated with and identifies a unique district. The first digit denotes one of the seven provinces, the 2nd and 3rd refer to the 82 cantons (unique within the province), the 4th and 5th the 488 districts (unique within the canton). The numbers are the same as used by the Instituto Nacional de Estadística y Censos (INEC).

District list

Notes
1. The Zarcero canton was previously known as Alfaro Ruiz. 
2. The Sarchí canton was previously known as Valverde Vega. 
3. Río Cuarto district became a canton in 2017, old postal code was 20306.
4. Santa Rita, Santa Isabel, Reventazón, Cabeceras don't have a postal code assigned yet as of June 2020, but the current INEC code will be assigned as such.

See also
Provinces of Costa Rica
Cantons of Costa Rica
National Geographic Institute of Costa Rica.
National Commission of Territorial Division.
National Commission of Nomenclature.

References

External links
 Search your Postal Code https://www.correos.go.cr/nosotros/codigopostal/busqueda.html

Costa Rica 3
Districts, Costa Rica
Subdivisions of Costa Rica